Marian Rosemarie Sutton (born 7 October 1963) is an English long-distance runner. She won the Chicago Marathon twice and competed for Britain at the 2000 Summer Olympics and several IAAF World Half Marathon Championships. She represented England at the 2002 Commonwealth Games, placing eighth in marathon.

Sutton came to prominence as a marathon runner when she finished fifth in the 1995 Chicago Marathon. Then determined to qualify for the 1996 Summer Olympics she with coach Bud Baldaro scheduled training to cope with the heat expected in Atlanta. However, she was not selected for the British team with Karen MacLeod and Suzanne Rigg taking the final two places alongside Liz McColgan. This snub spurred Sutton on to win the Chicago Marathon in 1996 and completed the double win a year later.
Sutton was selected for the 2000 Summer Olympics as the only Briton.

Competition Record

References

External links 
 
 
 

1963 births
Living people
Athletes from London
British female long-distance runners
English female long-distance runners
British female marathon runners
English female marathon runners
Olympic athletes of Great Britain
Athletes (track and field) at the 2000 Summer Olympics
Commonwealth Games competitors for England
Athletes (track and field) at the 2002 Commonwealth Games
Chicago Marathon female winners